Metadriopea albomaculata is a species of beetle in the family Cerambycidae, and the only species in the genus Metadriopea. It was described by Breuning in 1977.

References

Acanthocinini
Beetles described in 1977
Monotypic beetle genera
Taxa named by Stephan von Breuning (entomologist)